Sally Ann Kornbluth is a cell biologist and the 18th president of the Massachusetts Institute of Technology in January 2023. She is the second female president of the university.

Kornbluth was previously the James B. Duke Professor of Pharmacology and Cancer Biology at Duke University School of Medicine. She served as the Provost at Duke from 2014 to 2022, and was the first woman to serve in this role. She also served as the chair of the Duke Kunshan University Board of Trustees.

Early life and education
Kornbluth grew up in Fair Lawn, New Jersey. Her mother, Marisa Galvany, was an opera singer.

Kornbluth received a B.A. in political science from Williams College in 1982 and a B.S. in genetics from Cambridge University in 1984, where she was a Herchel Smith Scholar at Emmanuel College. She received a Ph.D. in molecular oncology from the Rockefeller University in 1989, working in the laboratory of Hidesaburo Hanafusa, and performed postdoctoral training at the University of California, San Diego with John Newport.

Career
Kornbluth became a member of the faculty at Duke University in 1994. She served as vice dean for basic sciences at Duke University School of Medicine from 2006 to 2014. Her research focuses on cell growth and programmed cell death and how cancer cells evade apoptosis. She is also interested in the role of programmed cell death in regulating the length of female fertility in vertebrates, in a mechanism regulated by caspase-2.

She received the Basic Science Research Mentoring Award from the Duke School of Medicine in 2012 and the Distinguished Faculty Award from the Duke Medical Alumni Association in 2013. She was elected as a member of the Institute of Medicine in 2013.

In 2014, after a national search, she was selected as Provost of Duke University, the first woman to serve in this role. As Provost, she has overseen a leadership transition in which female Deans have become a majority at Duke. Kornbluth is an advocate of liberal arts education and has stated that her own experience in a liberal arts education at Williams College led her to a career in the sciences. Ellen Davis, a professor of Bible and Practical Theology at Duke and a member of the search committee that selected Kornbluth as Provost, commented that Kornbluth's liberal arts education "gives her a strong base to understand and guide our programs." She is also an advocate for on-line learning as a driver of pedagogic innovation.

In her capacity of Chair of the Board of Trustees at Duke Kunshan University, Kornbluth has overseen the appointment of Al Bloom as the university's Executive Vice Chancellor in 2020, and the launch of the WHU-Duke Research Institute in collaboration with Duke and Wuhan universities in 2014.

In 2022, Kornbluth was selected as the 18th president of the Massachusetts Institute of Technology, and will succeed L. Rafael Reif in this role in 2023.

References 

Living people
Year of birth missing (living people)
American microbiologists
Women microbiologists
Duke University faculty
Williams College alumni
Alumni of Emmanuel College, Cambridge
Rockefeller University alumni
Members of the National Academy of Medicine